The steppe brown bear (Ursus arctos priscus) is a disputed extinct subspecies of brown bear that lived in Eurasia during either the Pleistocene or the early Holocene epochs, but its geological age is uncertain. Fossils of the bear have been found in various caves in Slovakia, particularly those of Vazec, Vyvieranie, Lisková, Kupcovie Izbicka, and Okno. It is argued that the species should be rendered invalid, as its geological age is unclear and "its skull is identical to modern U. arctos."

Description
It was more carnivorous than a modern brown bear, consuming  of meat per day.

References

Extinct bears
Pleistocene bears
Pleistocene carnivorans
Pleistocene extinctions
Pleistocene mammals of Europe
Fossils of Slovakia
Fossil taxa described in 1818